Younghusband Peninsula is a long narrow peninsula in South Australia. It separates the Coorong Channel, the Tauwitchere Channel and the Coorong which are part of the estuary of the River Murray from the Southern Ocean which including water bodies such as Encounter and Lacepede Bays. It lies entirely within the Coorong National Park. Younghusband Peninsula was named after William Younghusband, M.P.

References

Peninsulas of South Australia